Melville Pettengill Merritt (November 11, 1897 – August 22, 1986) was an American football player and coach.  He served as the head football coach at Allegheny College in Meadville, Pennsylvania for three seasons, from 1926 until 1928. His coaching record at Allegheny was 8–15–2.

References

1897 births
1986 deaths
Allegheny Gators football coaches
Dartmouth Big Green football coaches
Dartmouth Big Green football players
People from Middleton, Massachusetts
Sportspeople from Essex County, Massachusetts